The  is a pedestrian zone in the Pokkinen district in Oulu, Finland. The area, together with the Oulu Market Square, is being managed by the Oulu City Centre Shopkeeper Association.

The pedestrian zone was established in Summer 1987. The name of the zone was derived from the French word . At first part of Kirkkokatu Street was converted to pedestrian use only. Later the zone was enlarged to Kauppurienkatu Street between Isokatu Street and the Market Square. The main square of the zone is the Oulu Central Square, where most of the festivals and other events of Rotuaari are held. In 2012, a heating system was placed under the whole length of the pedestrian part of Kirkkokatu (including the Central Square), so that it will be free of ice and snow during the winter months.

References

External links 
 

Pedestrian malls
Pokkinen
Streets in Oulu
Tourist attractions in Oulu